Mingo County is a county in the U.S. state of West Virginia. As of the 2020 census, the population was 23,568. Its county seat and largest city is Williamson. Created in 1895, Mingo is West Virginia's newest county, named for the historic Iroquoian Mingo people.

History
Mingo County is West Virginia's newest county, formed by an act of the state legislature in 1895 from parts of Logan County. The county was named for the Mingo Indians.

At the time of its creation, Mingo County was divided into magisterial districts, which the United States Census Bureau classifies as a type of non-functional subdivision serving purely administrative purposes. After West Virginia's establishment in 1863, its counties were initially divided into civil townships, with the intent to encourage local government. This proved impractical in the heavily rural state, and in 1872 the townships were converted into magisterial districts.

Mingo County's five original districts were Hardee, Harvey, Lee, Magnolia, and Stafford. As West Virginia's only county established after 1871, Mingo is unique in never having been divided into townships, but Hardee, Lee, and Magnolia districts were formerly districts in Logan County, and Hardee and Magnolia were townships until 1872.

A sixth district, Warfield, was created from part of Harvey District in 1906, followed by the formation of Williamson District from part of Lee in 1908; Williamson District was coextensive with the City of Williamson. In the 1920s, Warfield District was renamed Kermit, after its chief town. An eighth district, Tug River, was formed from part of Lee District in 1947. Mingo County was redistricted in 2005, at which time Hardee and Tug River Districts were consolidated to form Tug Hardee, and Harvey and Kermit were consolidated to form Kermit Harvey.

The attempt to unionize coal miners in the county in the 1920s led to the Battle of Blair Mountain in neighboring Logan County.

Mingo County is well known for its opposition to former President Barack Obama. In 2008, Obama received only 8% of the vote in the Democratic primary, one of his worst performances nationwide. In 2012, Keith Russell Judd, a convicted felon who was the only other candidate on the ballot, received more Mingo County primary votes than Obama.

In 2014 Mingo County native Jeremy T. K. Farley published The Ghosts of Mingo County, based on the real-life story of Timmy Barker, a history of what Farley called "the bloodiest county in America." The book met with mixed reviews; some residents said it portrayed the county as too lawless, while others believed the book told the county's history accurately.

In 2016 Mingo County was "one of the places in America most touched by opioids."

Geography

Major highways
 (future)
 (future)
 U.S. Highway 52
 U.S. Highway 119
 West Virginia Route 49
 West Virginia Route 65
 West Virginia Route 80

Adjacent counties
Lincoln County (north)
Logan County (northeast)
Wyoming County (east)
McDowell County (southeast)
Pike County, Kentucky (west)
Martin County, Kentucky (west)
Wayne County (northwest)
Buchanan County, Virginia (southeast)

Demographics

2000 census
As of the census of 2000, there were 28,253 people, 11,303 households, and 8,217 families living in the county. The population density was 67 people per square mile (26/km2). There were 12,898 housing units at an average density of 30 per square mile (12/km2). The racial makeup of the county was 96.39% White, 2.34% Black or African American, 0.24% Native American, 0.21% Asian, 0.02% Pacific Islander, 0.06% from other races, and 0.74% from two or more races.  0.48% of the population were Hispanic or Latino of any race.

There were 11,303 households, out of which 33.50% had children under the age of 18 living with them, 56.20% were married couples living together, 12.70% had a female householder with no husband present, and 27.30% were non-families. 25.20% of all households were made up of individuals, and 10.40% had someone living alone who was 65 years of age or older. The average household size was 2.49 and the average family size was 2.98.

In the county, the population was spread out, with 24.20% under the age of 18, 9.20% from 18 to 24, 29.10% from 25 to 44, 25.00% from 45 to 64, and 12.40% who were 65 years of age or older. The median age was 37 years. For every 100 females there were 93.70 males. For every 100 females age 18 and over, there were 90.20 males.

The median income for a household in the county was $21,347, and the median income for a family was $26,581. Males had a median income of $31,660 versus $18,038 for females. The per capita income for the county was $12,445. About 25.90% of families and 29.70% of the population were below the poverty line, including 38.90% of those under age 18 and 18.60% of those age 65 or over.

2010 census
As of the 2010 United States census, there were 26,839 people, 11,125 households, and 7,707 families living in the county. The racial makeup of the county was 97.1% white, 1.8% black or African American, 0.2% Asian, 0.1% American Indian, 0.0% from other races, and 0.9% from two or more races. Those of Hispanic or Latino origin made up 0.4% of the population. In terms of ancestry, 12.6% were Irish, 11.9% were American, 7.0% were German, and 6.9% were English.

Of the 11,125 households, 30.8% had children under the age of 18 living with them, 52.6% were married couples living together, 11.8% had a female householder with no husband present, 30.7% were non-families, and 27.7% of all households were made up of individuals. The average household size was 2.40 and the average family size was 2.91. The median age was 40.9 years.

The median income for a household in the county was $32,902 and the median income for a family was $40,199. Males had a median income of $46,917 versus $27,168 for females. The per capita income for the county was $17,629. About 16.9% of families and 21.6% of the population were below the poverty line, including 30.1% of those under age 18 and 10.8% of those age 65 or over.

Politics
The youngest of West Virginia's 55 counties, Mingo was created from deeply secessionist Logan County. Consequently, for the 110 years following its creation, Mingo County was staunchly Democratic, voting for Walter Mondale—who came within 3,819 votes of losing all 50 states—by a two-to-one margin in 1984, and voting Republican only for William Howard Taft in 1908, Herbert Hoover in 1928 due to widespread anti-Catholic sentiment against Al Smith, and Richard Nixon against the left-wing George McGovern in 1972. Like all of West Virginia, since 2000 a combination of declining unionization and differences with the Democratic Party's liberal views on social issues has produced a dramatic swing to the Republican Party. In 2016, Mingo County voted only five percentage points less Republican than historically Unionist and rock-ribbed GOP Grant County.

In state elections, Mingo County remained very Democratic up until the mid-2010s. In the 2018 U.S. Senate election, Democrat Joe Manchin lost Mingo County despite winning statewide.

Communities

City
Williamson (county seat)

Towns
Delbarton
Gilbert
Kermit
Matewan

Magisterial districts
 Beech Ben Mate
 Kermit Harvey
 Lee
 Magnolia
 Stafford
 Tug Hardee
 Williamson

Historical magisterial districts
 Hardee
 Harvey
 Kermit
 Tug River

Census-designated places
Chattaroy
Gilbert Creek
Justice
Red Jacket

Unincorporated communities

Baisden
Bias
Borderland
Breeden
Dingess
Edgarton
Isaban (part)
Lenore
Meador
Naugatuck
Newtown
Nolan
Ragland
Taylorville 
Rawl
Varney
Verner (part)
Wharncliffe
Wilsondale

Notable people
Don Blankenship, former president and CEO of Massey Energy, 2018 Senate candidate
H. Truman Chafin, former and longest-serving state senator
Doc Edwards, former Major League Baseball catcher and manager
Robert H. "Doc" Foglesong, four-star general in the United States Air Force, president of Mississippi State University from 2006 to 2008
James H. "Buck" Harless, timber and coal operator, former president and CEO of International Industries
Sid Hatfield, Matewan chief of police and hero of the Battle of Matewan, murdered by Baldwin-Felts "detectives"
Anse Hatfield, patriarch of Hatfield family involved in Hatfield–McCoy feud

See also
 Coal camps in Mingo County, West Virginia
 Elk Creek Wildlife Management Area
 Laurel Lake Wildlife Management Area
 National Register of Historic Places listings in Mingo County, West Virginia

References

External links
Mingo County official website
Mingo County Board of Education
Mingo County History
East Fork VFD at Dingess, WV
 West Virginia Mine Wars Museum independent history museum covering the Mine Wars Era in Matewan, WV.

 
1895 establishments in West Virginia
Counties of Appalachia
Populated places established in 1895